Ronald H. "Ron" Rawls II (born November 20, 1983) is an American Christian musician, who is mainly a producer, songwriter, and composer of sacred music. He is a Grammy Award-winning and GMA Dove Award-winning producer.

Early and personal life
Rawls was born, Ronald H. Rawls II, on November 20, 1983. He is married to Shayna Rawls, where they reside in Tampa, Florida.

Music career
His music production songwriting career commenced around 2007, where he obtained a Grammy Award and GMA Dove Award, for his production work on Mandisa's 2013 studio album, Overcomer.

References

External links
 Official website

1983 births
Living people
African-American Christians
African-American songwriters
African-American record producers
Record producers from Tennessee
Musicians from Nashville, Tennessee
Songwriters from Tennessee
21st-century African-American people
20th-century African-American people